North Carolina increased its apportionment from 10 to 12 seats after the 1800 census.

See also 
 North Carolina's 8th congressional district special election, 1802
 United States House of Representatives elections, 1802 and 1803
 List of United States representatives from North Carolina

Notes 

1803
North Carolina
United States House of Representatives